Turkmenistan participated in the Turkvision Song Contest 2014 in Kazan, Tatarstan, Russia. Züleyha Kakayeva was internally selected to represent the country in the contest with the song "Shikga-Shikga Bilerzik".

Background
Turkmenistan had initially planned to participate in the inaugural  contest in Eskişehir, Turkey, but withdrew a few days before the contest began.

Before Turkvision
Turkmenistan's participation in the contest was confirmed on 13 November 2014, six days before the contest began, by the contest's official website, turkvizyon.tv. Züleyha Kakayeva was internally selected to represent Turkmenistan with the song "Shikga-Shikga Bilerzik".

At Turkvision

Semi-final
Turkmenistan performed third in the semi-final on 19 November 2014, placing 15th in a field of 25 countries with 164 points, thus qualifying for the final.

Final
Turkmenistan performed eighth in the final on 21 November 2014, placing 5th in a field of 15 countries with 192 points.

Voting
The results were determined solely by jury voting. Each country was represented by one juror who gave each song, with the exception of their own country's song, between 1 and 10 points. The Turkmenistani juror was Atageldi Garyagdyev.

Points awarded to Turkmenistan

Points awarded by Turkmenistan

References

Countries in the Turkvision Song Contest 2014
Turkvision
Turkmenistan in the Turkvision Song Contest